The FIAPF Award is awarded by the International Federation of Film Producers Associations (FIAPF) for an outstanding achievement in film in the Asia-Pacific region. The winners of this award are

 2007 Dr. George (Miliotis) Miller, Australia
 2008 Yash Raj Chopra - India
 2009 Isao Matsuoka - Japan
 2010 Christine Hakim - Indonesia
 2011 Zhang Yimou - Peoples's Republic of China
 2012 Ryuichi Sakamoto - Japan
 2013 Lee Choon-yun - Republic of Korea
 2014 Emile Sherman - Australia
 2015 Esaad Younis - Egypt
 2016 Manoochehr Mohammadi - Islamic Republic of Iran 
 2017 Bianca Balbuena - Philippines 
 2018 Nandita Das - India
 2019 Katriel Schory - Israel
 2020 Soros Sukhum - Thailand
 2021 Sergey Selyanov - Russian Federation
 2022 Nadine Labaki - Lebanon

External links
Official Website
FIAPF Award Winner archive

Asia Pacific Screen Awards
Awards for best film
Lists of films by award